Translational activator GCN1 is a protein that in humans is encoded by the GCN1L1 gene.

Interactions
GCN1L1 has been shown to interact with CDC5L.

References

Further reading